This  is a list of Christian women in the patristic age who contributed to the development of the early Christian churches and communities. The list is roughly in chronological order of year when they lived or died. The patristic era is considered to have started at the end of the 1st century and to have ended towards the close of the 7th century. 

The description column uses the historical, literary or archeological evidence (such as letters, inscriptions, texts and funerary art) to summarise women's contribution to the early church and their legacy.  As far as possible, historical sources are used rather than hagiography. The position, titles, status or "also known as" are listed in the first column under the woman's name. Some were referred to during their life as deacons, presbyters, ministers,  martyrs, Empress or Augusta. Later they may have been called church patrons, teachers, leaders, church mothers, Desert Mothers, martyrs or saints. 

There is a link in the woman's name to her Wikipedia page or one mentioning her. Readers can go to the linked page to read more life details and about any churches who may venerate her.

See also
 List of Christian martyrs
 Christian pacifism
 Patristics
 Persecution of Christians
 Religious Persecution

References

Christian women of the patristic age, List of
Christian women of the patristic age, List of
Christian women of the patristic age, List of
Christian women of the patristic age, List of
Christian women of the patristic age, List of
Christian women of the patristic age, List of
Christian women of the patristic age, List of
Women of the patristic age, List of Christian
Women of the patristic age, List of Christian